Pfäffikon is a municipality in the canton of Zürich in Switzerland. It is the seat of the district of the same name. It is not to be confused with Pfäffikon SZ on Lake Zurich but in the canton of Schwyz.

History

In Roman era, along Pfäffikersee there was built a Roman road from the vicus Centum Prata (Kempraten) on Obersee–Lake Zürich via Vitudurum (Oberwinterthur) to Tasgetium (Eschenz) to the Rhine. To secure this important transport route, the Irgenhausen Castrum was built. The native name of the fort is unknown, thus Irgenhausen was mentioned in 811 AD as Camputuna sive Irincheshusa. Maybe the castrum's name was Cambodunum, the name of the neighbouring village of Kempten (Wetzikon).

Pfäffikon is first mentioned in 811 as faffinchova.  In 965 it was mentioned as haffinchova.

Geography
 

Of this area, 43.3% is used for agricultural purposes, while 23.4% is forested. Of the rest of the land, 16.7% is settled (buildings or roads) and the remainder (16.5%) is non-productive (rivers, glaciers or mountains).   housing and buildings made up 11.9% of the total area, while transportation infrastructure made up the rest (4.8%). Of the total unproductive area, water (streams and lakes) made up 11.4% of the area.   13.6% of the total municipal area was undergoing some type of construction.

Pfäffikon is situated on Pfäffikersee in Zürcher Oberland southeastern of the city of Zürich. Neighbouring municipalities are Bäretswil, Bauma, Fehraltorf, Hittnau, Russikon, Seegräben, Uster, Wetzikon and Wildberg.

The town is divided into four districts (Aussenwachten), namely Auslikon, Irgenhausen and Rutschberg situated on Pfäffikersee, as well as the districts of Ober Balm, Unter Balm, Bussenhausen, Oberwil, Sulzberg, Hermatswil, Schür, Wallikon, Rick, Ravensbühl, and Faichrüti.

Demographics
, 17.6% of the population was made up of foreign nationals.   the gender distribution of the population was 49% male and 51% female. Over the last 10 years the population has grown at a rate of 12.1%. Most of the population speaks German  (86.9%), with Italian being second most common ( 4.6%) and Albanian being third ( 2.3%).

In the 2007 election the most popular party was the SVP which received 37.8% of the vote.  The next three most popular parties were the SPS (15.4%), the CSP (14.5%) and the Green Party (10.7%).

The age distribution of the population is children and teenagers (0–19 years old) make up 23.5% of the population, while adults (20–64 years old) make up 62% and seniors (over 64 years old) make up 14.5%.  In Pfäffikon about 73.3% of the population (between age 25-64) have completed either non-mandatory upper secondary education or additional higher education (either university or a Fachhochschule).  There are 3954 households in Pfäffikon.

Pfäffikon has an unemployment rate of 2.52%.  , there were 200 people employed in the primary economic sector and about 58 businesses involved in this sector.  1635 people are employed in the secondary sector and there are 99 businesses in this sector.  2379 people are employed in the tertiary sector, with 352 businesses in this sector.   50% of the working population were employed full-time, and 50% were employed part-time.

 there were 2549 Catholics and 4771 Protestants in Pfäffikon. In the 2000 census, religion was broken down into several smaller categories. Of the rest of the population, 0% were Muslim, 7.5% belonged to another religion (not listed), 2.4% did not give a religion, and 9.5% were atheist or agnostic.

The historical population is given in the following table:

Weather
Pfäffikon has an average of 139.3 days of rain per year and on average receives  of precipitation. During the wettest month, August, there is precipitation for an average of 12.3 days. The month with the most days of precipitation is May, with an average of 13.4, but with only  of precipitation.

Transportation 
Pfäffikon ZH railway station is a stop of the S-Bahn Zürich on the line S3.

Notable people 
 Bernhard Hirzel (1807–1847) a Swiss theologian and Orientalist, became pastor in Pfäffikon in 1837
 Jakob Heusser-Staub (1862–1941) a Swiss industrialist and philanthropist 
 Florian Froehlich (born 1959 in Pfaeffikon) a contemporary artist who creates paintings, sculptures, stained-glass and installations
 Darije Kalezić (born 1969 in Pfäffikon) a Bosnian-Herzegovinian and Swiss former footballer, 220 club caps

References

External links 

 Official Website of Gemeinde Pfäffikon ZH 
 Statistics for Gemeinde Pfäffikon ZH

 GIS Browser of the canton of Zürich: Pfäffikon

 
Municipalities of the canton of Zürich
Pfäffikersee